Piriaka was a station on the North Island Main Trunk line, in the Ruapehu District of New Zealand, serving Piriaka. It formally opened on 9 November 1908, though it was renamed from Pirihaka on 25 April 1902 and work was well advanced by 1903, with the rails laid south of Piriaka by May 1904. Goods traffic started on 11 October 1904. By 10 November 1908 a passing loop could take 48 wagons and there was a 6th class station, with water supply, privies and urinals, a  x  passenger platform, loading bank, cattle yards and a  x  goods shed.

The level crossing, on what is now SH4, was replaced by a concrete bridge in 1937.

The railway delivered cream to Kaitieke butter factory, which opened at Piriaka in 1913 and produced over 400 tons of butter in 1923. By 1937 roads had improved, but the railway was still taking some supplies to the factory.

References

External links 

 1911 photo of Piriaka
 Video - train at Piriaka in 2017

Railway stations in New Zealand
Ruapehu District
Rail transport in Manawatū-Whanganui
Buildings and structures in Manawatū-Whanganui
Railway stations opened in 1904
Railway stations closed in 1972